Nicholas Z. Kafoglis (January 16, 1930 – February 9, 2019) was an American politician and physician in the state of Kentucky.

Kafoglis served in the Kentucky House of Representatives from 1972 to 1976 and in the Kentucky Senate from 1988 to 1998. He was a Democrat. Kafoglis was born in Lexington, Kentucky and went to the Lexington public schools. He received his bachelor's and medical degrees from Yale University and the University of Pennsylvania. Kafoglis was a physician and lived in Bowling Green, Kentucky. Kafoglis served in the United States Air Force. He was the son of Greek immigrants. He died in Branford, Connecticut after breaking his hip.

References

1930 births
2019 deaths
Physicians from Lexington, Kentucky
Politicians from Bowling Green, Kentucky
Politicians from Lexington, Kentucky
Military personnel from Lexington, Kentucky
University of Pennsylvania alumni
Yale University alumni
Democratic Party members of the Kentucky House of Representatives
Democratic Party Kentucky state senators
American people of Greek descent